Rains is a surname, and it may refer to:

 Albert Rains (1902 – 1991), American politician from Alabama
 Ashleigh Rains, Canadian actress
 Claude Rains (1889 – 1967), American actor
 Dan Rains (born 1956), American football player
 Darby Lloyd Rains (born 1948), American adult-film actress
 Dominic Rains (born 1982), Iranian-American actor
 Ed Rains (born 1956), American basketball player
 Emory Rains (1800 – 1878), American lawyer, judge and politician from Texas
 Ethan Rains, Iranian-American actor
 Euclid Rains, American politician
 Fred Rains (1860 – 1945), British actor and film director
 Gabriel J. Rains (1803 – 1881), American soldier
 Gene Rains, American jazz musician
George Rains
 Jack Rains (born 1937), American lawyer and politician from Texas
 James Edwards Rains (1833 – 1862), American lawyer and soldier
 James S. Rains (1817 – 1880), American soldier
 Lyle Rains, American video-game developer and businessman
 Michael Rains, American criminal defense attorney
 Omer Rains (born 1941), American politician, lawyer, author, eco-entrepreneur and humanist from California
 Rob Rains, American sports journalist
 Traver Rains (born 1977), American TV personality, fashion designer, and photographer

See also 
 Raines (surname)